Gianluca Francesconi (born 10 September 1971 in Rome) is a retired Italian professional footballer who played as a defender.

1971 births
Living people
Italian footballers
Italy under-21 international footballers
Serie A players
Serie B players
S.S.C. Napoli players
A.C. Reggiana 1919 players
Juventus F.C. players
Genoa C.F.C. players
Delfino Pescara 1936 players
Association football defenders